The 2017 Shoot Out (officially the 2017 Coral Snooker Shoot Out) was a professional ranking snooker tournament which took place at the Watford Colosseum in Watford from 23 to 26 February 2017. It was played under a variation of the standard rules of snooker. In 2017 it was extended from 64 to 128 players, and became a ranking tournament for the first time in its history. It was the 15th ranking event of the 2016/2017 season.
 		
Robin Hull was the defending champion, but he lost 18–25 to Fergal O'Brien in the second round.

Anthony McGill won his second ranking title, beating Xiao Guodong 1–0 in the final (67–19).

This was the first time that no century break was made in the competition. The highest break was a 96 from Graeme Dott.
This was the 300th ranking event to be staged in snooker.

Prize fund
The breakdown of prize money for this year is shown below.

Winner: £32,000
Runner-up: £16,000
Semi-final: £8,000
Quarter-final: £4,000
Last 16: £2,000
Last 32: £1,000
Last 64: £500
Last 128: £250

Highest break: £2,000
Total: £146,000

The "rolling 147 prize" for a maximum break stood at £15,000.

Format and rules
2017 rules.

Tournament draw

Top half

Section 1

Section 2

Section 3

Section 4

Bottom half

Section 5

Section 6

Section 7

Section 8

Finals

Final

References

2017
2017 in snooker
2017 in English sport
2017
February 2017 sports events in the United Kingdom